Humberto Luna is a Spanish-language radio personality, TV host, and movie actor. He currently has a Spanish-language radio show broadcast throughout the United States called El Show de Humberto Luna.

Biography
He now has an afternoon show at La Ranchera 96.7fm in Los Angeles
Previously, Humberto Luna hosted the morning show at LA PRIMERA 87.7 FM Radio Station(Las Vegas NV)  . He is a veteran of the Los Angeles radio market with over 35 years of experience.  He was the lead morning show disc jockey at KTNQ-AM in Los Angeles, Heftel Broadcasting Corporation''' flagship property. From 1991 to 1995 he hosted the Television show La Hora lunática, .

Humberto Luna has a star on the Hollywood Walk of Fame.

References

Sources
 Popular Spanish Personality Humberto Luna to Join Clear Channel Radio's La Preciosa Network, Business Wire, January 9, 2009
 Big City Radio, Inc. Announces Humberto Luna To HostMorning Show At Viva 107.1 Los Angeles'', Business Wire, January 6, 2000

External links
  Star on the Hollywood Walk of Fame

1948 births
American radio personalities
Living people
Mexican emigrants to the United States
People from Zacatecas